Captain James Cranstoun, 8th Lord Cranstoun (1755–22 September 1796) was an officer of the Royal Navy.

The third son of James Cranstoun, 6th Lord Cranstoun, he succeeded to the title on 1 August 1778 on the death of his elder brother William Cranstoun, 7th Lord Cranstoun.

Cranstoun reached the rank of Lieutenant on 19 October 1776 and Captain on 31 January 1780. He commanded HMS Belliqueux at the Battle of St. Kitts in January 1782 and after the Battle of the Saintes in April was sent home with the despatches (in which he was mentioned) bearing news of the victory. From 1791 to 1793 he was Captain in HMS Assistance and in 1795 commanded HMS Bellerophon under Admiral Cornwallis at the First Battle of Groix.

He was appointed Governor of Grenada in 1796 but before taking up his appointment he died at Bishop's Waltham on 22 September that year, as a result of lead poisoning in cider. He was buried at the Royal Garrison Church, Portsmouth.

Lord Cranstoun was married on 19 August 1792 to Elizabeth, youngest daughter of Lieutenant-Colonel Lewis Charles Montolieu and sister-in-law of Alexander Murray, 8th Lord Elibank and of James Bland Burges (later Sir James Bland Lamb, 1st Baronet). They had no children, so the title passed to Lord Cranstoun's nephew. Lady Cranstoun died on 27 August 1797, aged twenty-seven.

Sources

 William Anderson, The Scottish Nation, vol. i, Edinburgh 1862 

1755 births
1796 deaths
Royal Navy personnel of the French Revolutionary Wars
Lords of Parliament
Royal Navy officers